Calpastatin is a protein that in humans is encoded by the CAST gene.

The protein encoded by this gene is an endogenous calpain (calcium-dependent cysteine protease) inhibitor. It consists of an N-terminal domain L and four repetitive calpain-inhibition domains (domains 1–4), and it is involved in the proteolysis of amyloid precursor protein. The calpain/calpastatin system is involved in numerous membrane fusion events, such as neural vesicle exocytosis and platelet and red-cell aggregation. The encoded protein is also thought to affect the expression levels of genes encoding structural or regulatory proteins. Several alternatively spliced transcript variants of this gene have been described, but the full-length natures of only some have been determined.

References

Further reading

External links
 The MEROPS online database for peptidases and their inhibitors: LI27.001

Proteases
EC 3.4